Hopkins Presbyterian Church, also known as Hopkins Methodist Church, is a historic church building located near the junction of CR 66 and CR 86 in Hopkins, Richland County, South Carolina.  It was built about 1891, and is a small, one-story frame building. It was built by a Methodist congregation, and purchased by a Presbyterian congregation in 1919.

It was added to the National Register of Historic Places in 1986.

References

Presbyterian churches in South Carolina
Methodist churches in South Carolina
Churches on the National Register of Historic Places in South Carolina
Churches completed in 1891
19th-century Presbyterian church buildings in the United States
Churches in Richland County, South Carolina
National Register of Historic Places in Richland County, South Carolina